Austrogomphus gordoni, also known as Austrogomphus (Xerogomphus) gordoni, is a species of dragonfly of the family Gomphidae, commonly known as the western red hunter. 
It inhabits streams and pools in Western Australia.

Austrogomphus gordoni is a small, black and yellow dragonfly with a red tip to its tail.

Gallery

See also
 List of Odonata species of Australia

References

Gomphidae
Odonata of Australia
Insects of Australia
Endemic fauna of Australia
Taxa named by J.A.L. (Tony) Watson
Insects described in 1962
Taxobox binomials not recognized by IUCN